César Alejandro Menacho Claros (born 9 August 1999) is a Bolivian professional footballer who plays as a forward for the Bolivia national team.

Club career
A youth academy graduate of Blooming, Menacho made his professional debut on 2 August 2018 in a 5–0 league win against Real Potosí. He scored his first goal on 15 April 2019 in a 4–2 win against Guabirá.

On 9 November 2020, Blooming and Bolivar announced that they have found an agreement for the transfer of Menacho.

International career
Menacho was part of Bolivian squad at 2019 South American U-20 Championship and 2020 CONMEBOL Pre-Olympic Tournament.

Menacho made his senior team debut on 10 October 2020 in a 5–0 loss against Brazil.

Career statistics

Club

International

References

External links
 

1999 births
Living people
Association football forwards
Bolivian footballers
Bolivia under-20 international footballers
Bolivia international footballers
Bolivian Primera División players
Club Blooming players
Club Bolívar players
C.D. Jorge Wilstermann players